The Assemblies of God of Egypt is a Pentecostal denomination which is present in Egypt. The number of its members possibly exceeds 100,000. It has been established in 1920.

References

See also 
Christianity in Egypt
Lillian Trasher
Copts

Pentecostal denominations in Africa
Protestantism in Egypt
Assemblies of God National Fellowships